Kesari is a weekly Malayalam language magazine affiliated publication of the Hindu nationalist volunteer organisation Rashtriya Swayamsevak Sangh (RSS) and it is also known as the mouthpiece of the RSS Kerala.

History
Kesari was started in 1951 by prominent RSS activists in kozhikode including Shankara Shastri. Kesari was first issued in on Tuesday, November 27, 1951, with P. Parameswaran as the editor in chief. In 1962, a trust called Hindustan Prakashan was formed and Kesari's ownership was vested in it. Kesari, like other newspapers, was registered under the Press Act, which came into force in 1957. Padma Vibhushan P. Parameswaran and R Venugopal have held senior posts in Kesari.

Controversies
An article in Kesari about former Prime Minister Jawaharlal Nehru caused controversy nationally.
An article in Kesari Weekly highlighting the relevance of RSS-CPM friendship led to controversy in Kerala.
An article praising Pinarayi Vijayan appeared on Kesari's website.but Kesari disowned it and claimed its account was hacked.

See also
Organiser (magazine)
Janmabhumi

References

External links
 Kesari

Malayalam-language magazines
Weekly magazines published in India
Magazines established in 1951